Ken Eyre (born 17 July 1946) is a former speedway rider from England.

Speedway career 
Eyre rode in the top tier of British Speedway from 1968 to 1974, riding primarily for Belle Vue Aces. He was an integral part of the Belle Vue team that won three consecutive league titles in 1970, 1971 and 1972.

References 

Living people
1946 births
British speedway riders
Belle Vue Aces riders
Wolverhampton Wolves riders
People from Buxton
Sportspeople from Derbyshire